The 1980 CRC Chemicals 500 was a NASCAR Winston Cup Series racing event that took place on September 14, 1980, at Dover Downs International Speedway, Dover, Delaware. The NASCAR Winston Cup Series was also plagued with top teams running big engines and finishing in third place to avoid inspection around the early-1980s.

This would be the last of 26 wins for Darrell Waltrip at DiGard, Inc.. Darrell won many races but the team struggled with reliability issues which cost Darrell every year except 1979. Darrell had a contract with DiGard that ran through 1982 but with the help of his father-in-law, Junior Johnson, and sponsor Mountain Dew he was able to get out of the contract at the end of 1980 and finally win his first Winston Cup title in 1981.

Background
Dover Downs International Speedway, now called Dover International Speedway, is one of five short tracks to hold NASCAR races; the others are Bristol Motor Speedway, Richmond International Raceway, Martinsville Speedway, and Phoenix International Raceway. The track's turns are banked at twenty-four degrees, and both the front stretch (the location of the finish line) and the backstretch are banked at nine degrees.

Race report
Twenty-nine lead changes were noticed amongst 11 different drivers. Kenny Hemphill, in his penultimate start, leads a Cup race for the only time.

A combination of racing veterans and relative newcomers to the sport made the 1980 NASCAR Cup Series racing amongst the closest ever seen within the 1970s and 1980s decades. The 1980 NASCAR season was also a rare period in time where the "little teams" could compete almost on a completely equal level against the "big organizations" of stock car racing. Today, independent organizations like NEMCO Motorsports and Robby Gordon Motorsports have a very harsh degree of difficulty to overcome  when trying to overtake powerhouses like Hendrick Motorsports, Richard Childress Racing, and Joe Gibbs Racing. The approximate time it took to complete the race was four hours and fourteen minutes using 500 laps of racing. Eight yellow flags slowed the race for 39 laps while Darrell Waltrip defeated Harry Gant by almost ½ of a second. The attendance for this paved oval track race was 35,500 live audience members. Waltrip would earn $22,900 just by winning this race ($ when adjusted for inflation).

Frank Warren would retire from NASCAR after this race along with Eddie Dickerson. Meanwhile, John Callis and Joel Stowe used this racing event to make their respective NASCAR debuts. Steve Gray was the last-place driver with a head gasket incident; earning only a meager prize amount of $450 for his 35 laps of racing ($ when adjusted for inflation). This would be one of the few races where Bobby Allison didn't win at the track that is now known as Dover International Speedway. Dale Earnhardt would have the NASCAR Winston Cup Series championship after this race. This would eventually lead to his 1980 NASCAR championship.

Top 10 finishers

Standings after the race

References

CRC Chemicals 500
CRC Chemicals 500
NASCAR races at Dover Motor Speedway